Maria Takolander, born in Melbourne in 1973, is an Australian writer of Finnish heritage.

Biography
Takolander graduated from Deakin University in 2003 with a PhD on magical realism. Since then she has continued to produce scholarly journal articles and book chapters in the field of magical realism, but she has also extended her research into the area of creativity studies, using neuroscientific findings to theorise how creativity works.

Takolander is also an acclaimed creative writer. Her six authored book publications are: a collection of short stories, The Double (Text, 2013); a book of literary criticism, Catching Butterflies: Bringing Magical Realism to Ground (Peter Lang, 2007); and four collections of poems, Trigger Warning (UQP, 2021), The End of the World (Giramondo, 2014), Ghostly Subjects (Salt, 2009) and Narcissism (Whitmore Press, 2005). She is also co-editor of The Limits of Life Writing (Routledge, 2018).

Takolander won the inaugural 2010 Australian Book Review Elizabeth Jolley short story competition,. A subsequent book of short stories, The Double, was shortlisted for the Melbourne Prize for Literature Best New Writing award. Her poetry collection Ghostly Subjects was short-listed for a 2010 Queensland Premier's Literary Award. Trigger Warning won the 2022 Victorian Premier's Literary Award.

Takolander's short stories, poems and essays have been widely published in Australia and overseas. Her poems have been widely anthologised. They appear in The Best Australian Poems 2005 (Black Inc), The Best Australian Poetry 2006 (UQP), The Best Australian Poems 2007 (Black Inc), The Best Australian Poems 2008 (Black Inc), The Best Australian Poems 2009 (Black Inc), The Best Australian Poetry 2009 (UQP), The Best Australian Poems 2010 (Black Inc), The Best Australian Poems 2011 (Black Inc), The Best Australian Poems 2012 (Black Inc), The Best Australian Poems 2013 (Black Inc), The Best Australian Poems 2014 (Black Inc), The Best Australian Poems 2015 (Black Inc), The Best Australian Poems 2016 (Black Inc), The Best Australian Poems 2017 (Black Inc) and The Best Australian Poems 2018 (Black Inc).  They also appear in Thirty Australian Poets (UQP 2011), The turnrow Anthology of Contemporary Australian Poetry (Turnrow 2014), #MeToo: Stories from the Australian Movement (Picador 2019), The Anthology of Australian Prose Poetry (MUP 2020), What We Carry: Poetry on Childbearing (Recent Work Press 2021) and Contemporary Australian Poetry (Puncher & Wattmann 2016). In the US, her poems have been published in Kenyon Review, Chicago Quarterly Review, Michigan Quarterly Review and Wisconsin Review. They have been translated into Spanish, German and Mandarin.

Takolander's words have also featured on public artworks, including at the Royal Botanic Gardens Victoria, and on the Bronze Stories plaques and walking trails app in Geelong.

Bronwyn Lea has written of Takolander's poetry: "Takolander’s poems are ruinous, diabolical, all the more so for their polish and precision. Here, as in Baudelaire, beauty is inextricably linked with evil: it’s 'the dark italics', as Wallace Stevens phrased it, that compels the poetic imagination in these poems … Don’t be surprised if they take up residence in your body after reading them … it’s just that kind of book."

Geordie Williamson, the chief literary critic at The Australian, has written of The Double: "Takolander, though immured in the same darkling stuff as Plath, always remains in command. Hers are a series of thought experiments in which enduring Western narratives are recast according to the author's imaginative and philosophical inclinations. The results are fiercely intelligent and idiosyncratic, sometimes shot through with black humour, sometimes pressing down on the reader with the full weight of human horror...Individually, Takolander's stories can be bleak. But collectively they are thrilling. Slender as this collection may be, it announces the arrival of a considerable talent."

Trigger Warning was shortlisted for the 2022 ALS Gold Medal.

Bibliography

Fiction

Poetry
 Trigger Warning, St Lucia: UQP, 2021.
 The End of the World, Artarmon: Giramondo, 2014.
 Ghostly Subjects, Cambridge: Salt, 2009.
 Narcissism, Geelong: Whitmore Press, 2005.

Non-fiction
 Catching Butterflies: Bringing Magical Realism to Ground. Bern: Peter Lang, 2007.
 Co-editor. The Limits of Life Writing. Oxon: Routledge, 2018.

References

External links 
 Official website

1973 births
Australian poets
Australian literary critics
Australian women literary critics
Living people
Australian women poets
Australian Book Review people
Thought experiments
Deakin University alumni